Vyalova Cave (пещера Вялова) is a cave in a lower plateau of the Chatyrdag mountain, Crimea. It also has an 'old' name: Togerik-Alan-Hosar (Тогерик-Алан-Хосар).

It belongs to the Vyalova Cave system.

The cave is named after Russian speleologist Vyalov.

Vyalova Cave system 
Vyalova Caves system is a system of three caves that are located on a lower plateau of the Chatyrdag mountain, Crimea.

The system consists of three caves (has three entrances): Uchunzhu Cave, Vyalova Cave and Obval'naya Cave (or Landslip Cave, Crimea).

External links
 A photo of the cave's mouth

Landforms of Crimea
Caves of Ukraine
Caves of Russia